The 53rd New York Film Festival was held September 25 – October 11, 2015.

The lineup consisted of seven sections:
 Main Slate (26 films and four shorts programs)
 Spotlight on Documentary (11 films and one shorts program)
 Projections (14 programs)
 Special Events (10 films)
 Revivals (11 films)
 Nathaniel Dorsky & Jerome Hiler Retrospective (12 programs)
 Convergence (transmedia presentations and talks)
The Festival also included various talks and free screenings. The primary selection committee included Kent Jones (chair), Dennis Lim, Marian Masone, Gavin Smith, and Amy Taubin. The Shorts Programs were selected by Sarah Mankoff, Laura Kern, Matt Bolish, Florence Almozini, and Dan Sullivan. Projections was programmed by Dennis Lim, Aily Nash, and Gavin Smith. The Dorsky/Hiler retrospective was programmed by Gavin Smith, and Convergence was curated by Matt Bolish.

Sections

Main Slate

Feature-length

Shorts

Spotlight on Documentary

Feature-length

Field of Vision: New Episodic Nonfiction

Projections

Special Events

Revivals

Retrospective

Nathaniel Dorsky

Jerome Hiler

References

External links 

New York Film Festival
2015 festivals in the United States
2015 film festivals
2015 in New York City